Joe DeFoor (born February 2, 1963) is an American former professional tennis player.

Born and raised in Marietta, Georgia, DeFoor played collegiate tennis for Clemson University and was an All-SEC selection in 1985. Following his time at Clemson he competed on the professional tour, reaching best rankings of 437 in singles and 223 in doubles. He was a doubles quarter-finalist at the 1988 Livingston Open.

ATP Challenger finals

Doubles: 1 (1–0)

References

External links
 
 

1963 births
Living people
American male tennis players
Clemson Tigers men's tennis players
Tennis people from Georgia (U.S. state)
Sportspeople from Marietta, Georgia